Nancy Elise Howell Etchemendy (born February 19, 1952) is an American writer of science fiction, fantasy, and horror including four children's novels.

Nancy Elise Howell was born in Reno, Nevada. Her novels, short fiction, and poetry have appeared regularly since 1980, both in the United States and abroad.  Her work has earned a number of awards, including three Bram Stoker Awards (two for children's horror), a Golden Duck Award for excellence in children's science fiction, and an International Horror Guild Award.   Her fourth novel, The Power of Un, was published by Front Street/ Cricket Books in March 2000.  Cat in Glass and Other Tales of the Unnatural, her collection of short dark fantasy for young adults, was published in 2002, also by Front Street/ Cricket Books and appears on the ALA Best Books for Young Adults list for 2002.  She holds a B.A. in Fine Arts and English Literature from University of Nevada, Reno.  She is a former officer of the Horror Writers Association, and currently serves on the board of the Clarion Foundation.  She attended the Clarion Science Fiction and Fantasy Writers' Workshop in 1982 at Michigan State University in East Lansing, Michigan.  She lives and works in Northern California and is married to John Etchemendy, former Provost of Stanford University.

Bibliography

Novels
 The Watchers of Space (Avon Books, 1980), illustrated by Andrew Glass
 Stranger from the Stars (Avon, 1983), illus. Teje Etchemendy
 The Crystal City (Avon, 1985) – sequel to The Watchers
 The Power of UN (Cricket Books, 2000)

Short fiction
Collections
 
Short stories

External links

 
 
 

1952 births
Living people
20th-century American novelists
20th-century American short story writers
20th-century American women writers
American children's writers
American fantasy writers
American horror writers
American science fiction writers
American women novelists
American women short story writers
The Magazine of Fantasy & Science Fiction people
University of Nevada, Reno alumni
Women horror writers
Women science fiction and fantasy writers
Writers from Reno, Nevada
21st-century American women